Chris Charlesworth is a British-based music journalist and author; and, between 1983 and 2016, managing editor of Omnibus Press. He is particularly noted for his work about, and with, The Who, for whom he has worked as an executive producer. Charlesworth also worked as David Bowie's publicist at RCA Records from 1979 to 1981.

Having started his career as a journalist on the Craven Herald & Pioneer in his home town of Skipton, Charlesworth began writing about music for the Bradford Telegraph. Charlesworth wrote for Melody Maker from 1970 to 1977, being variously its News Editor and US Editor from 1973 based in New York City.

Notable interviews  for Melody Maker include; John Lennon, Paul McCartney, David Bowie, Led Zeppelin, The Who, Rod Stewart & The Faces, The Byrds, Bruce Springsteen, Elton John, The Beach Boys, Eric Clapton, CSN&Y, The Band, Black Sabbath, Slade, Paul Simon, Alice Cooper, Traffic, Free, Santana, The Eagles, Deep Purple, Yes, Frank Zappa, Iggy Pop, The Bee Gees and Steely Dan.

Charlesworth has contributed to numerous other magazines in the US and UK and written books on many rock artists.

In 1995, at Pete Townshend's request, Charlesworth compiled and co-produced The Who's 4-CD boxed set 30 Years of Maximum R&B, released by Polydor Records internationally and by MCA Records in the US, and was subsequently involved in the upgrade of The Who's back catalogue for remastered CDs.

He lives in Surrey, England.

Selected works 
 
 
 Slade: Feel The Noize (Omnibus Press, 1984, 
 Townshend: A Career Biography (Proteus, 1984 )

Discography
 The Who
 The Who by Numbers - executive producer
 30 Years of Maximum R&B

References

External links
Just Backdated
COPAC bibliography
LinkedIn profile

British music journalists
Living people
Year of birth missing (living people)
People from Surrey
Place of birth missing (living people)